The 2002 Formula Nissan 2000 season was contested over seven race weekends with 14 races. In this one-make formula all drivers had to use Coloni CN1/C chassis and Nissan engines used on the previous 2001 Open Telefónica by Nissan season. Twelve different teams and 25 drivers competed with the titles going to Spanish driver Santiago Porteiro and Spanish team Meycom.

Teams and drivers
All teams used the Coloni CN1/C chassis and Nissan engines.

Race calendar and results

Final points standings
For every race the points were awarded: 15 points to the winner, 12 for runner-up, 10 for third place, 8 for fourth place, 6 for fifth place, winding down to 1 point for 10th place. Lower placed drivers did not award points. Additional points were awarded to the driver setting the fastest race lap (2 points). 

 Points System:

{|
|

External links

Renault Sport Series seasons
Formula Nissan 2000
Formula Nissan 2000
Nissan 2000